The English-language idiom "raining cats and dogs" or "raining dogs and cats" is used to describe particularly heavy rain. It is of unknown etymology and is not necessarily related to the raining animals phenomenon. The phrase (with "polecats" instead of "cats") has been used at least since the 17th century.

Etymology 
A number of possible etymologies have been put forward to explain the phrase.

One possible explanation involves the drainage systems on buildings in 17th-century Europe, which were poor and may have disgorged their contents, including the corpses of any animals that had accumulated in them, during heavy showers. This occurrence is described in Jonathan Swift's 1710 poem "Description of a City Shower":

Another explanation is that "cats and dogs" may be a corruption of the Greek word , referring to the waterfalls on the Nile, possibly through the old French word  ('waterfall'). In old English,  meant a cataract or waterfall.

"Cats and dogs" may come from the Greek expression , which means “contrary to experience or belief”; if it is raining cats and dogs, it is raining unusually hard. There is no evidence to support the theory that the expression was borrowed by English speakers. 

An online rumor largely circulated through email claimed that, in 16th-century Europe, animals could crawl into the thatch of peasant homes to seek shelter from the elements and would fall out during heavy rain. However, no evidence has been found in support of the claim.

There may not be a logical explanation; the phrase may have been used just for its nonsensical humor value, or to describe particularly heavy rainfall, like other equivalent English expressions ("raining pitchforks", "raining hammer handles").

Equivalent expressions in other languages 
Other languages have equally bizarre expressions for heavy rain.

See also 

English-language idioms
 Rain of animals

References

Folklore
Metaphors referring to dogs
Metaphors referring to cats